Badaki or Badeki may refer to:
 Badaki, Eqlid, Fars Province
 Badaki, Marvdasht, Fars Province
 Badaki, Chaypareh, West Azerbaijan Province
 Badaki, Urmia, West Azerbaijan Province